Staraya is a rural locality (a village) in Klyazminskoye Rural Settlement, Kovrovsky District, Vladimir Oblast, Russia. The population was 414 as of 2010. There are 4 streets.

Geography 
Staraya is located 16 km east of Kovrov (the district's administrative centre) by road. Skomorokhovo is the nearest rural locality.

References 

Rural localities in Kovrovsky District